James Kembi Gitura is a Kenyan politician.  He was  a Deputy Speaker of the Kenyan Senate between 2013 and 2017.

Political life 
Gitura represented the Kiharu Constituency in the National Assembly (Kenya) from 2003 to 2007. Subsequently, he was appointed as the Kenyan Ambassador to Belgium, serving from 2009 until his resignation in 2012 in order to stand for election to the Senate.

After winning a seat in the Senate, Gitura was elected as the Deputy Speaker of the Senate on 28 March 2013. He received 39 votes.

Gitura later lost his seat in to Irungu Kang'ata in the 2017 Kenya general election
Consequently, Kembi Gitura was appointed the Chairperson of KEMSA where he led until 2021 when he was fired for alleged scandal in procuring COVID-19 supplies. Gitura understands the political life of Kenya. He is currently  chairperson of the Communications Authority of Kenya (CA).

References

1953 births
Living people
Members of the Senate of Kenya
Members of the National Assembly (Kenya)
University of Nairobi alumni
People from Murang'a County